Achaea mezentia is a moth of the family Erebidae first described by Caspar Stoll in 1780. It is found in India and Sri Lanka.

The caterpillar is known to feed on Canthium, Guioa canescens, Ixora, Sapindus laurifolia, and Elaeodendron glaucum species.

References

Moths of Asia
Moths described in 1780